Newcastle Boys' High School was a government-funded single-sex selective high school, located in Waratah, a suburb of Newcastle, New South Wales, Australia. The school was active between 1929 and 1976, after which time it became a co-educational non-selective school.

History 
Newcastle Boys High School was established in 1929 when the Hill High School was split into two selective single-sex schools, the other being Newcastle Girls High School.  Hill High School's campus was located on Newcastle Hill, at a site now occupied by Newcastle East Public School, and was referred to as "the School on the Hill".  Newcastle Girls High School moved to a new campus in Hamilton, and Newcastle Boys High School moved to a new campus in Waratah in 1934, at which time Hill High School became Newcastle Junior Boys High School. Both Newcastle Boys and Newcastle Girls high schools carried on the traditions established by the original school, including use of the same motto and school colours.

Newcastle Boys High School became non-selective and co-educational in 1977 and changed its name to Waratah High School that same year. Later it became Waratah Technology High School, and then Waratah Technology Campus of Callaghan College in 2000.

Headmasters 
The Headmasters of Newcastle Boys High School were:
 1930–31 Robert Frederick Harvey
 1932–34 Charles Herbert Christmas
 1935–44 Norman Ross Mearns
 1945–47 William Pillans
 1948–63 Frank Harold Beard
 1964–74 Leonard Thomas Richardson
 1975–76 Victor Huish Webber (relieving)

School song 
Newcastle Boys High School continued to sing the Newcastle High School song: words by a member of staff, R. G. Henderson MA set to the tune of "D'ye ken John Peel?", chosen by competition announced in 1913 in the school journal, "Novocastrian". When the boys moved to the plain at the Waratah site, they no longer climbed up The Hill and the first verse was re-written in 1943 by Mr Hodge.

Science scholarships 
The following Newcastle Boys' High School students won scholarships to the Professor Harry Messel International Science School:

Extra-curricular activities 
The following Newcastle Boys' High School boys were awarded "Blues" by the New South Wales Combined High Schools Sports Association under the system which operated from 1957 to 1980:

Notable alumni
 Michael BackFreehills Brisbane managing partner
 Reginald Ian Barrettjurist; Judge, Supreme Court of New South Wales(2001–)
 Jonathan Bigginsentertainer, writer
 Leigh Blackmorehorror writer, critic, editor, musician
 Peter Cavejournalist; Current Affairs Foreign Editor, Australian Broadcasting Corporation
 Peter Robert Charlton (1946–2007)journalist, soldier, military historian; editor at The Courier-Mail from 1996
 William T. Cooper artist and ornithologist
 Phil Cousins community worker, surf life-saver, mines rescue leader; Venerable Order of Saint John (2004), Centenary Medal (2003), named Open Champion (First Aid) Surf Life Saving Australia (1994 and 1997), Gold Medallion NSW Mines Rescue Service (1993)
 Julian Croftnovelist and poet; Emeritus Professor of English, University of New England
 Howard Crozier  (1936–)teacher, education administrator, CSIRO manager, shire councillor, grazier
 Roger Dean Federal Member for Robertson 1949–64, Administrator of the Northern Territory 1964–70, diplomat
 Robert Douglas medical practitioner and academic; chair, SEE-Change ACT; emeritus professor and visiting fellow, Australian National University; chair, Australia 21
 Gary GilmourAustralian cricketer
 Ross Gittins author; economics editor of The Sydney Morning Herald
 Kevan Gosperinternational sports administrator; company director
 John Hardingviolinist; Concertmaster, Hong Kong Philharmonic Orchestra (2006–)
 Sam Jonestrade unionist, politician; Labor member of New South Wales Legislative Assembly for Waratah (1965–84)
 Patrick McGorrypsychiatrist, academic, 2010 Australian of the Year
 Jeffrey Milesauthor, jurist; Chief Judge, Supreme Court of the Australian Capital Territory (1985–2002)
 Arthur MorrisAustralian cricketer
 Peter MorrisFederal Minister; Federal Member for Shortland 1972–98
 Gary Neatjournalist and author; Foreign Correspondent ABC Indochina/SE Asia; CEO of the Queensland Liberal Party; Senate Candidate & Federal Executive; National President – Australian Institute of Management
 Dick Tooth Australian rugby union footballer, orthopaedic surgeon and sports science pioneer
 Ivan Welshpolitician; Lake Macquarie mayor and member of New South Wales Legislative Assembly (1988–91)

Notable teachers
 Kelver Hartley

References

External links 
 Newcastle Boys High School Old Boys Association

Defunct public high schools in New South Wales
History of Newcastle, New South Wales
Education in Newcastle, New South Wales
1929 establishments in Australia
Educational institutions established in 1929
1976 disestablishments in Australia
Educational institutions disestablished in 1976